MetroWest Medical Center is a teaching hospital in Framingham and Natick, Massachusetts.

It is the largest health care provider in the MetroWest region between Boston and Worcester. MWMC was formed by the 1992 merger of two hospitals in neighboring towns: Framingham Union Hospital and Natick's Leonard Morse Hospital; the two hospitals have a combined capacity of 302 beds.  It was acquired by Columbia/HCA in 1996; Tenet Health Systems in 1999; Vanguard Health Systems in 2009; and once again Tenet Healthcare Corp. in 2013 when Tenet acquired Vanguard. MWMC also operates an outpatient diagnostic and rehabilitation facility, MetroWest Wellness Center, in Framingham. MetroWest is affiliated with the Tufts Children's Hospital.

See also 
 Health care in the United States
 Massachusetts General Hospital, also known as MGH
 University of Massachusetts, Worcester, medical school

References

External links 
 

1992 establishments in Massachusetts
Buildings and structures in Framingham, Massachusetts
Buildings and structures in Natick, Massachusetts
Hospitals established in 1992
Hospitals in Middlesex County, Massachusetts
MetroWest
Teaching hospitals in Massachusetts

Tenet Healthcare